Der Flügel is a far-right faction within Germany's Alternative for Germany (Alternative für Deutschland, AfD), a right-wing populist opposition party. The group was led by Björn Höcke and Andreas Kalbitz (banned from AfD in 2020). Approximately 20 percent of AfD members are organized also in the "Flügel". Following the request by the AfD executive board to dissolve Der Flügel by the end of April 2020, the group's online presence went offline. The Office for the Protection of the Constitution has no reliable knowledge of an actual dissolution. Within the party, the Flügel now calls itself the "social-patriotic faction".

History
The Flügel's founding document, the Erfurt Declaration of 2015, describes AfD as a "resistance movement against the further erosion of the identity of Germany." Henry Bernhard of DLF wrote in 2019 that the group's radicalization was apparent at the group's annual meetings (Kyffhäusertreffen), with the group increasingly accepting "racism, Islamophobia, anti-Semitism, xenophobia, historical revisionism," and the downplaying of Nazi crimes. Höcke and Kalbitz are controversial for their links to neo-Nazi groups.

The group attained a dominant position in the AfD associations of several states in eastern Germany, particularly Brandenburg, Saxony, Saxony-Anhalt, and Thuringia. In 2020, the group was estimated to have some 7,000 members, constituting one-fifth of the AfD's total membership. The group has been the subject of internal party battles within the AfD, where relative moderates within the party have opposed the influence of extremist elements. Leading AfD politicians, like AfD-chairman Jörg Meuthen, criticized Höcke's "personality cult" but not necessarily his far-right political positions.

The Federal Office for the Protection of the Constitution (BfV) classified the Flügel in January 2019 as a suspected case of right-wing extremism, since its "propagated policy concept was aimed at exclusion, contempt and far-reaching rights of foreigners, migrants, especially Muslims, and politically dissenting people." In March 2020, the BfV classified the Flügel as "a right-wing extremist endeavor against the free democratic basic order" that was incompatible with Germany's Basic Law, and placed the group under intelligence surveillance. Following the BfV's announcement, the AfD's national leaders demanded the dissolution of the Flügel, and Höcke and Kalbitz asked members to "cease their activities." However, the Flügel members were not asked to leave the AfD, and in their announcement of the group's disbandment, Höcke and Kalbitz wrote that, "In principle, it is not possible to dissolve what does not formally exist." The pair also retained their leadership positions in two of the AfD's state associations.
In January 2022, Meuthen declared that he would resign from the party chairmanship with immediate effect and resign from the AfD.

Notable AfD-politician Jörg Meuthen resigned in January 2022 from the party chairmanship and from the AfD. He justified this with the fact that he had lost the power struggle with the formally dissolved right-wing extremist "Der Flügel" over the political direction of AfD. Meuthen criticized that the party had developed far to the right and was in large parts no longer concurrent with the Liberal democratic basic order in Germany.

Important persons and influence

 Andreas Kalbitz, spokesman of  AfD Regional Association Brandenburg, banned from AfD in 2020, spokesman of Flügel
 Björn Höcke, spokesman of AfD state Association Thuringia, spokesman of Flügel
 Götz Kubitschek, a theorist of Neue Rechte
Frank Pasemann, former member of Bundestag, excluded 2020 from AfD, still active within the party
 Hans-Thomas Tillschneider, activist of Neue Rechte with connections to IB, member of Landtag of Saxony-Anhalt for AfD
 Christine Anderson, Member of European Parliament for AfD, once spokesman of Flügel

References

2015 establishments in Germany
German nationalism
Far-right politics in Germany
Anti-Islam sentiment in Germany
Anti-immigration politics in Germany
Antisemitism in Germany
Historical negationism
Islamophobia in Europe
Political party factions in Germany
Radicalization
Alternative for Germany